Ontario Southern Railroad may refer to:
Ontario Southern Railroad (New York), predecessor of the Pennsylvania Railroad
Ontario Southern Railway (Ontario), a defunct monorail